Narasimha Jharni (local kannada: ನರಸಿಂಹ ಝರನಿ), also known as Narasimha Jharni cave temple, is a temple located in Bidar, Karnataka. It is associated with Lord Narasimha, an incarnation (avatar) of Hindu god Vishnu. The ancient temple is excavated in a 300 m tunnel under the Manichoola hill range situated at around 4.8 km from the city.

Other names
 Jharani Narasimha Cave Temple
 Jharni Narasimha Swamy
 Jharani Narasimha Temple
 Narasimha Swami Jharani Temple
 Narasimha Jhira Cave Temple
 Narasimha Zarni Cave Temple
 Narasimha Jheera Temple
 Narasimha Jharna
 Narasimha Jhara

Temple description
One has to wade through the cave wherein water height varies from 4 feet to 5 feet to have a glimpse of the deity's image formed on the laterite wall at the end of tunnel which is  architectural wonder. Bats can be seen hanging on the roof of the cave and flying throughout the tunnel. It is a wonder that no one has been harmed by the bats till date. People utter the words govinda-govinda and narasimha hari-hari with devotion as mantras. The end of the cave temple is the sanctum sanctorum which houses two deities – Lord Narasimha and a Shiva Linga which the demon Jharasura (Jalasura) had worshipped. Around eight people can stand and watch this spectacular sight as there is very little space in there. Others need to wait in the water for their turn. Since the water flows continuously and people walk in it, the water does not remain crystal clear. People carry kids into the temple on their shoulder. The water has sulphur in it and is said to have healing properties for people having skin problems. This temple is especially visited by many couples seeking children.  As this is one of its kind temple, the overall experience can be thrilling & adventurous.

Narasimha Avatar
Lord Vishnu guarded the child devotee Prahlada, who was put to endless torture by his father Hiranyakashipu, a Demon, for repeating God's name instead of his own. But Prahlada withstood all these tortures with steadfast devotion. Finally God appeared in the form as Man-Lion, and killed the Hiranyakashipu. In this Man-Lion incarnation, the God's emphasis is on devotion.

SCRIPTURES 
The fourth incarnation of Lord Vishnu, Lord Narasimha, is half human and half lion. Legend says that Narasimha after killing Hiranyakashipu, slew another giant named Jharasura (Jalasura) who was a staunch devotee of Lord Shiva. While breathing his last, Jharasura beseeched Vishnu (or rather, his incarnation) to reside in the cave in which he was living and to grant boons to devotees. Granting last wish of his, Narasimha came to live in the cave. There is a roughly carved image of Narasimha on a stone wall at the end of the cave. After being killed, the demon turned into water and started flowing down the feet of the Lord Narasimha. The flow of water in the cave tunnel is continuous since then. The spring has never dried out.

Geology
Narasimha Jharni is a tubular spring. Though Bidar is at an elevation, the temple is at a lower level. It is located amidst the slopes of the hilly terrain. The lateritic rock formation under the plateau enables percolation of surface water. Bidar urban plateau is of irregular shape, land stretching about 35.4 km in length and 19.3 km in width. The plateau consists of red laterite rocky crust, of a depth varying from 30.5 m to 152.4 m supported on impervious trap base.
This has resulted in springs at the cleavages between trap and laterite rocks. Such water springs can be observed in Bidar also at Guru Nanak Jhira Sahib Gurudwara, Papanasha Shiva Temple etc.

Significance
People throng to this temple because it is believed that the Deity at the Narasimha Jharni Cave temple is a swayambhu roopam – in other words, the deity is self manifested and is very powerful.

Recent developments
To facilitate the devotees, the cave temple has been Air conditioned and Electrified for lighting systems. The temple is open from 8AM to 6PM. The facilities at the temple are planned in a systematic way to draw more visitors. Creation of parking space, multi-purpose hall, rooms, overhead tank to ensure adequate water supply to the devotees and a percolation tank to make use of the water coming out of the cave has been taken up. A new approach road to the temple is being constructed to make a "systematic" entry to the temple. The pre-existing entry was not according to Vaastu. Now they are not allowing pilgrims to enter the cave as the water flow is slow.

See also 
 List of India cave temples

References

Tourist attractions in Bidar
Hindu cave temples in Karnataka
Hindu temples in Bidar district
Purana temples of Vishnu
Narasimha temples